This list of 2013 in paleobotany records new  fossil plant taxa that were described during 2013, as well as other significant discoveries and events related to paleobotany that occurred in the year.

Chlorophyta

Bryophyta

Ferns and fern allies

Ginkgophytes

Gnetophyta

Pachytestopsida

Pinophyta

Angiosperms

Other seed plants

Other plants

References

2013 in paleontology
Paleobotany
2013 in science